Cortelyou is a surname. Notable people with the surname include:

 Jacques Cortelyou (c. 1625–1693), Surveyor General of New Netherland
 George B. Cortelyou (1862–1940), first US Secretary of Commerce and Labor and later Secretary of the Treasury

See also
 Cortelyou, Alabama
 Cortelyou Road (BMT Brighton Line), a rapid-transit station in Brooklyn, New York